The Empress of Japan is the title given to the wife of the Emperor of Japan or a female ruler in her own right. In Japanese, the empress consort is called . The current empress consort is Empress Masako, who ascended the throne with her husband on 1 May 2019. Much like their male counterparts, female rulers who ascend the throne by their birthright are referred to as 天皇 (tennō), but can also be referred to as 女性天皇 (josei tennō) or 女帝 (jotei). josei tennō refers only to an empress regnant of Japan, and jotei refers to an empress regnant of any countries.

Empresses regnant 

There were eight female imperial reigns (six female emperors including two who reigned twice) in Japan's early history between 593 and 770, and two more in the early modern period (Edo period). Although there were eight reigning empresses, with only one exception their successors were selected from amongst the males of the paternal Imperial bloodline. After many centuries, female reigns came to be officially prohibited only when the Imperial Household Law was issued in 1889 alongside the new Meiji Constitution.

The eight historical empresses regnant are:

 Nukatabe, Empress Suiko (推古天皇 Suiko Tennō) was the 33rd empress of Japan from 593 until 628, according to the traditional order of succession, and the first historically attested woman to hold this position. She was the granddaughter of Tashiraga of Yamato, herself sister of the childless Emperor Buretsu, transferring some legitimacy in succession to the throne of Yamato to her husband Emperor Keitai. Tashiraga's mother had been Kasuga of Yamato, sister of the childless Emperor Seinei, whose own marriage with the future Emperor Ninken had a similar effect a generation earlier.  According to legends, these ladies descended from the legendary Empress Jingū, who had been ruler (since Meiji-era rewrites of history, Regent) of Yamato for decades at some time in the past, probably in the mid-4th century (if she really existed), and who herself descended, according to legends, from Amaterasu omikami, the Sun Goddess of the Japanese pantheon.
 Takara, Empress Kōgyoku (皇極天皇 Kōgyoku Tennō), also Empress Saimei (斉明天皇 Saimei Tennō) was the 35th and 37th empress of Japan, initially from February 18, 642, to July 12, 645, ascending upon the death of her uncle Emperor Jomei (who had also been her second husband). When she abdicated, her own younger brother succeeded her. However, upon the death of the said younger brother, she reascended the throne as Empress Saimei on February 14, 655, and ruled until her death on August 24, 661. She was succeeded by her and Emperor Jomei's son, Naka no Ōe, as Emperor Tenji.
 Unonosasara, Empress Jitō (持統天皇 Jitō Tennō) was the 41st imperial ruler of Japan, and ruled from 686 until 697. The previous emperor was her uncle and husband, Emperor Tenmu, and she later abdicated the throne to her grandson Emperor Monmu.
 Ahe, Empress Genmei (also Empress Genmyō; 元明天皇 Genmei Tennō) was the 43rd imperial ruler of Japan ruling 707–715 (died December 7, 721). She was Empress Jitō's younger half-sister and the mother of Emperor Monmu, who died in an young age.
 Hitaka, Empress Genshō (元正天皇 Genshō Tennō) was the 44th monarch of Japan (715–724). She succeeded after her mother Empress Genmei and later abdicated to her nephew Emperor Shōmu, son of Emperor Monmu.
 Abe, Empress Kōken (孝謙天皇 Kōken Tennō) also Empress Shōtoku (称徳天皇 Shōtoku Tennō) was the 46th imperial ruler of Japan from 749 to 758, and the 48th from 764 to 770. Her posthumous name for her second reign (764–770) was Empress Shōtoku. She never married and her ex-crown prince was Prince Bunado, her first cousin twice removed, but after her death, another of her cousins ascended the throne as Emperor Kanmu, who was also her brother-in-law.
 Okiko, Empress Meishō (明正天皇 Meishō Tennō) was the 109th empress of Japan, reigning from December 22, 1629, to November 14, 1643. She ascended upon the abdication of her father, being the eldest surviving child of her parents (the empress, Tokugawa Masako, had only four daughters without surviving sons), holding priority over her younger half-brothers.
 Toshiko, Empress Go-Sakuramachi (後桜町天皇 Go-Sakuramachi Tennō) was the 117th empress of Japan, and ruled from September 15, 1762, to January 9, 1771. She abdicated in favor of her young nephew. Surviving over forty years, the retired Empress held all those decades the position of Dajo Tenno, and acted as sort of guardian of subsequent emperors.

Other than the eight historical empresses regnant, two additional empress are traditionally believed to have reigned, but historical evidence for their reigns is scant and they are not counted among the officially numbered Emperors/Empresses regnant:

 Empress Jingū r. 206–269 (Empress Consort of Emperor Chūai)—not counted among the officially numbered Emperors
 Iitoyo: Imperial princess and possibly empress regnant. She was baptized as Empress Tsunuzashi in the list of emperors of Japan, written by Ernest Mason Satow

Under Shinto religious influence, the goddess Amaterasu, who is of the highest rank in the kami system, might suggest that Japan's first rulers were women. According to the Kojiki and Nihon Shoki chronicles in Japanese mythology, the Emperors of Japan are considered to be direct descendants of Amaterasu.

Empress consort

In ancient Japan, most of the empresses consort were princesses, except for Iwa no hime (empress consort of Nintoku). After Empress Kōmyō (empress consort of Shōmu), daughters of the Fujiwara clan or other clans could become empresses consort. Originally, Chūgū (中宮) referred to the palace of the Kōgō (皇后), Kōtaigō (皇太后) (Empress Mother/Empress Dowager), or Tai-Kōtaigō (太皇太后) (Grand Empress Mother/Grand Empress Dowager). Until the mid-Heian Period, the emperor had only one empress consort, and the empress consort was also called Chūgū. From the time of Emperor Ichijō, when emperors had two empresses consort, one of them came to be called Kōgō and another one was called Chūgū. After maiden Princess Yasuko became Kōgō as the honorary or adoptive mother (准母) of Emperor Horikawa, maiden princesses could also become Kōgō.

List of empresses consort
Kōgō (皇后) is the title of a non-reigning empress consort. The title, still in use, is generally conferred on an emperor's wife who had given birth to the heir to the throne. The title was first awarded posthumously in 806 to the late mother of Emperor Heizei.

Chūgū (中宮) was a term that evolved during the Heian period; and it came to be understood as the title of the empress. For a time, Chūgū replaced Kōgō; and then the titles became interchangeable.

The numbers of Kōgō varied, but there was only one Chūgū at a time.

The title Kōtaigō (皇太后) was given to the wife of an ex-emperor; and the title Tai-kōtaigō (太皇太后) came to be used by dowager empresses.

List of empresses dowager

List of grand empresses dowager

See also 
 Emperor of Japan
 List of emperors of Japan
Himiko
Taiyoo
Imperial House of Japan
Japanese imperial succession debate
Dayang Kalangitan
Kōkyū
List of Nyoin
Midaidokoro
List of female castellans in Japan

References 

 Japanese empresses
Japan